Stolarski (feminine Stolarska) is a Polish occupational surname equivalent to English Carpenter. Notable people include:

 Marcin Stolarski (born 1996), Polish swimmer
 Paweł Stolarski (born 1996), Polish footballer
 Zdzisław Stolarski (born 1948), Polish wrestler

See also
 
 Stolarska Street, Kraków, Carpenter's Street in Kraków

Polish-language surnames
Occupational surnames